Camas Uig (Uig Bay) is a bay on the west coast of the Isle of Lewis, in the Outer Hebrides of Scotland. The Lewis Chessmen were discovered in the dunes behind the beach.

Camas Uig contains a variety of small islets including Fraoch Eilean, Leac Holm, Sgeir a' Chàis, Sgeir Liath, Sgeir Sheilibhig, Tom and Tolm.

Camas Uig is in the parish of Uig and is part of the South Lewis, Harris and North Uist National Scenic Area.

In 1831, the 12th-century Lewis Chessmen were discovered in a small stone structure in the dunes behind the beach near Ardroil. Two large wooden chessmen, carved by Stephen Hayward, stand outside a museum on the machair at Ardroil, near where the hoard was found.

References

Notes

Isle of Lewis
Bays of Scotland
Beaches of the Outer Hebrides
Viking Age sites in Scotland
Landforms of the Outer Hebrides